Peigan refers to two Native tribes in the Blackfoot Confederacy:

 Northern Peigan, in Alberta, Canada
 Piegan Blackfeet in Montana, USA

See also
Pagan